Baishui (白水镇, lit. "white water") could refer to the following Chinese towns:

 Baishui, Fujian, in Longhai
 Baishui, Gansu, in Kongtong District, Pingliang
 Baishui, Guizhou, in Guanling Buyei and Miao Autonomous County
 Baishui, Miluo, Hunan
 Baishui, Qiyang County, Hunan
 Baishui, Jishui County, Jiangxi
 Baishui, Wangcang County, Sichuan
 Baishui, Honghe, in Luxi County, Yunnan
 Baishui, Zhanyi County, Yunnan